Sulochana Gadgil is an Indian meteorologist who retired as Professor from the Centre for Atmospheric and Oceanic Sciences (CAOS) in Bangalore, India. She has studied the how and why of monsoon, including farming strategies to cope with rainfall variability and modeling ecological and evolutionary phenomena. Her research led to the discovery of a basic feature of the sub-seasonal variation in the monsoon cloud bands.

She demonstrated that the monsoon is not a gigantic land-sea breeze  but instead is a manifestation of the seasonal migration of a planetary scale system which is seen over non-monsoonal regions as well. In collaboration with the farmers she derived farming strategies which are tailored to the rainfall variability of different regions in India.

Early life and education

She was born in 1944 in Pune. She hails from a famous genealogical lineage with her great-grandfather being a Minister in the state of Tonk known for his heroic efforts to help the people during the severe droughts. Her grandfather and father were respected physicians of their time. At the same time, her grandfather was a freedom fighter and hosted several active participants of the struggle against colonial rule at his house.  Her mother was a Marathi writer.

She did her early schooling in Pune, in the Marathi medium. She then went on for high-school education in English to Rishi Valley, a boarding school in Andhra Pradesh.  She came back to Pune for her undergraduate studies at Fergusson College where she opted for natural sciences and majored in Chemistry, Physics and Mathematics. At this juncture, she became engaged to Madhav Gadgil, a fellow student and together they decided to pursue scientific careers. They were both admitted with scholarships from Harvard.

Return to India
In 1971, she returned to India with her husband, who was also a Harvard scholar. She worked in the Indian Institute of Tropical Meteorology as a CSIR pool officer for two years. She worked with scientists like R. Ananthakrishnan and D.R Sikka during this period. She was recruited to the Centre for Theoretical Studies (CTS) as a member. Her husband was also recruited to CTS as a mathematical ecologist. Out of this, a new institution, the Centre for Atmospheric and Oceanic Sciences (CAOS), was born.

Personal life
She is married to Madhav Gadgil, an ecologist and they have a daughter and a son.

See also 
 Madhav Gadgil

References

Living people
Indian oceanographers
Women meteorologists
Indian meteorologists
Women oceanographers
Indian climatologists
Harvard University alumni
Savitribai Phule Pune University alumni
Scientists from Bangalore
Scientists from Maharashtra
20th-century Indian women scientists
21st-century Indian earth scientists
Women scientists from Maharashtra
20th-century Indian earth scientists
Indian women earth scientists
21st-century Indian women scientists
Women climatologists
1944 births